The Chocoan long-tongued bat (Lonchophylla chocoana) is a species of bat found in South America. It was described as a new species in 2004.

Taxonomy and etymology
It was described as a new species in 2004. Its species name "chocoana" is derived from El Chocó—the region where it is found.

Description
Its fur is chocolate- or chestnut-brown on its back and brown on its ventral side. It has short ears with rounded tips. Its dental formula is  the same as all other members of its genus:  for a total of 34 teeth.

Range and habitat
Its range includes Ecuador and Colombia in South America. It has only been documented in old-growth rainforest.

Conservation
As of 2016, it is evaluated as data deficient by the IUCN.

References

Lonchophylla
Mammals described in 2004
Bats of South America